Robert Devereux may refer to:

Robert Devereux, 2nd Earl of Essex (1565–1601), favourite of Queen Elizabeth I, executed for treason
Robert Devereux, 3rd Earl of Essex (1591–1646), son of the above
Robert Devereux, 16th Viscount Hereford (1843–1930), English peer.
Robert Devereux, 17th Viscount Hereford (1865–1952)
Robert Devereux, 18th Viscount Hereford (1932–2004)
Roberto Devereux, an 1837 opera by Donizetti
Robert Devereux (rugby union) (1897–1974), American rugby union player
Robert Devereux (civil servant) (born 1957), British civil servant
Robbie Devereux (born 1971), English footballer

See also
Devereux (surname)